Zaal (Zaliko) Udumashvili (born 27 February 1971) is a Georgian journalist and politician. He is a member of United National Movement Georgia and he was voted third at the Elections for Mayor of Tbilisi in 2017.

Early life 
Tbilisi is where Udumashvili was born. He was a journalist between 1992 and 2017. He was a journalist for Rustavi 2 from 2003 to 2017. From 1989 to 1994, Zaal studied at Tbilisi Zoology University.

He has a wife and two sons. He studied at TSU. He was a judge of Georgia's Got Talent!

Career 
He worked at Me-2 Arkhi, 1TV, Iberia, and Rustavi 2. On 16 December 2018, he protested at Telavi.

He stated

Udumashvili responded to violence carried out on Rustavi 2 journalists, stating "What happened yesterday at Rustavi 2's building was not really so. The spontaneous reaction of the Georgian march was a well planned and organized attack on Rustavi 2. In general, we have been accustomed to the fact that any form of violence against Rustavi 2 is justified, it will be legal, moral or physical. This is exactly what happened yesterday, so if yesterday's attackers will not be punished before the law and the law will not stand. At its height, we have all the grounds to say that the government gives a green light to violence that is directed against Rustavi 2".

In his interview about the 2018 president election, he stated, "The more the elections are coming, the more naturally the Bidzina Ivanishvili will terrorize the business,"

Udumashvili stated that Bidzina Ivanishvili would cover only the debt of 600 thousand people in the black list of debtors.

"It is a well-known fact that Bidzina Ivanishvili is not funding his own money and will not fund the project to announce Bakhtadze. The amnesty will have to pay the money from their own pocket. A memo has been set up with Cartu Bank. Everyone is summoned to ask people to pay the money to make some projects Bidzina Ivanishvili. All this will end with the background of business in Georgia, except for the business that is directly related to Bidzina Ivanishvili, ".

External links

References

1971 births
Living people
Recipients of the Presidential Order of Excellence